The Register, originally the South Australian Gazette and Colonial Register, and later South Australian Register, was South Australia's first newspaper. It was first published in London in June 1836, moved to Adelaide in 1837, and folded into The Advertiser almost a century later in February 1931.

The newspaper was the sole primary source for almost all information about the settlement and early history of South Australia. It documented shipping schedules, legal history and court records at a time when official records were not kept. According to the National Library of Australia, its pages contain "one hundred years of births, deaths, marriages, crime, building history, the establishment of towns and businesses, political and social comment".

All issues are freely available online, via Trove.

History

The Register was conceived by Robert Thomas, a law stationer, who had purchased for his family  of land in the proposed South Australian province after being impressed by the ideas of Edward Gibbon Wakefield. The first issue (printed by William Clowes & Sons, Duke-street, Stamford-street, Lambeth, London), appeared in London on 18 June 1836 with his friend and partner, George Stevenson, as editor. Thomas embarked for South Australia aboard the  later that year, arriving on 10 November 1836 with his family and equipment to set up a printing plant. It was six months before the first colonial edition of The Register was printed on 3 June 1837 in a small mud hut on Town Acre No. 56 in Hindley Street, near what is now named Register Place. (The colloquialism "mud hut" would seem to be an understatement for a substantial pisé building in which was operated a demy Stanhope press, an ancient wooden press, and racks holding "half a ton of bourgeois and brevier type, a good fount of small pica for printing official documents, and a quantity of general jobbing type" with all the other requirements for editing, setting up, printing and distributing an admittedly small circulation newspaper.)

From the start, the paper asserted a strongly independent stance. Stevenson's style was vigorous and provocative, making himself and The Register several enemies. His opposition to Colonel William Light's choice of site for the new capital and J.H. Fisher as Resident Commissioner, led them and others to found the Southern Australian in direct competition with The Register. The paper's antagonism of Governor Gawler led to The Register losing government business notably the South Australian Government Gazette. The printers Thomas & Co. had disengaged themselves from editorial content in June 1839 in a vain attempt to protect their monopoly and lost about £1,650 a year. His protest that he was authorised by the British Government to do its printing failed and, insolvent, he sold the paper for £600 to James Allen (previously editor of the South Australian Magazine) in 1842, as Stevenson withdrew from journalism.

Thomas also published the weekly Adelaide Chronicle and South Australian Literary Record (10 December 1839 – 18 May 1842).

John Stephens, who had in 1843 founded The Adelaide Observer, in 1845 purchased The Register. Anthony Forster became part owner in 1848; With the death of Stephens in 1850, his share was taken over by John Taylor. Forster's share was taken over by Joseph Fisher in 1853, then sold to John Howard Clark in 1865.

The paper, having been printed sporadically previously, became weekly in June 1838 and later twice-weekly from February 1843. By 1840, The Register employed a staff of 21. These were an editor, three pressmen, ten compositors, two binders, a collector, a clerk, delivery man and two boys. One of its compositors also acted as sub-editor. Its circulation by 1840 was 900. 

On 1 January 1850, it became a daily publication, and three years later the paper was bought back by Thomas's son William Kyffin Thomas as part of South Australia's first media syndicate with Anthony Forster, Edward William Andrews and Joseph Fisher. They also purchased its weekly sister publication, The Adelaide Observer, and established The Evening Journal (January 1869 – September 1912) which morphed into The Journal (October 1912 – July 1923) which then became The News. Its Saturday edition was called The Saturday Journal (July 1923 – April 1929). 

The Register outlasted many competitors throughout its long history, holding a monopoly on the market at various stages, but it ultimately met its match in The Advertiser. The Advertiser, founded in 1858, first emerged as a serious challenger to the paper in the 1870s. The defining move which swung Adelaide readership from the conservative Register to the more egalitarian Advertiser was the latter's dramatic price reduction from 2d. to 1d., and hiring an army of canvassers, on commission, to peddle the paper. The Register was slow to respond, the Advertiser started putting its circulation figures on the masthead. By the time the Register cut its price the die was cast. The Advertiser bought out The Register and closed it down in February 1931 after the Great Depression had severely reduced its fortunes, forcing it to become largely pictorial.

Chronology

Details are from an article marking the 50th anniversary of its first publication in South Australia and from 1886 the article "Sketch of the History of the Register" except where noted.
1836 Vol. 1 No. 1 printed in London by Clowes and Sons for Robert Thomas and George Stevenson on 18 June
Proclamation of South Australia printed for government on 30 December; the first printing job in the new colony
1837 The press was moved to Acre 56, 37 Hindley Street just west of Morphett Street on 1 June.
The South Australian Gazette and Colonial Register Vol 1, issue 2 appears, dated 3 June 1837. Although subscribers were promised weekly publication, subsequent issues were published on 8 July, 29 July, 12 August, 16 September, 4 October, 19 October, 11 November. Price at this time was 6d. per issue.
1838? Robert's son William Kyffin Thomas (born 1821), aged 16, began work for the paper.
1839 Government retracted Thomas's right to publish Government Gazette on 15 June. The paper was henceforth titled South Australian Register. Price was raised to 1s. (12d.)
1840 Thomas and Stevenson purchased The Adelaide Chronicle copyright and equipment from W. C. Cox; the newly-incorporated Chronicle (edited by J. F. Bennett) being published on Wednesdays and the Register on Saturday.
Early in year enlarged from 6 demy pages to 8, then on 29 August turned to broadsheet format.
1842 Purchased by James Allen
1843 Premises moved to corner of Rundle and King William Streets – the "Beehive Corner".
Publication moved to twice-weekly.
1845 Register purchased in June by John Stephens, who had acted as editor for some months several years previously. Stephens' own paper The Adelaide Observer, a weekly newspaper directed at regional South Australia, first published 29 June 1843 and printed by George Dehane, was published concurrently. R. D. Hanson was his hard-working lawyer and occasional contributor.
Moved to larger premises in Hindley Street
1848 Anthony Forster became part-owner, but after a few months took no part in its running.
1850 Daily publication began in January. Around this time price was reduced to 4d.
Stephens died 28 November. Publication taken over by William Kyffin Thomas.
1851 Charles Day employed as junior.
1853 The paper was taken over by a syndicate of seven, which soon reduced to four: Forster, Joseph Fisher, E. W. Andrews and William Kyffin Thomas.
1854 Move from Hindley Street to Grenfell Street and steam-powered press installed
 Andrew Garran joined as editor, left for Sydney in 1856
1856? J. H Barrow became co-editor around this time. He left in 1858 to become co-founder of The Advertiser (Adelaide).
1858 W. W. R. Whitridge succeeded Barrow; he died in 1861.
1860 Robert Thomas died: editorship was taken over by John Taylor.
Gas lighting installed (from their own generator until town gas was available)
1864 Price reduced to 3d.
1865 Fisher's share sold to John Howard Clark
1868 Sister newspaper Evening Journal began publication
1870 Format changed from broadsheet to 8 pages of smaller size. Price was unchanged at 3d.
1877 E. W. Andrews died
J. Howard Clark died
Charles Day, John Harvey Finlayson and Robert Kyffin Thomas (who were all involved with its production) were brought in as partners.
1878 William Kyffin Thomas died
Circulation reached 10,000.
1882 Price reduced to 2d.
1890 C. Day retired from the partnership; Robert Kyffin Thomas took his place as commercial manager.
1892 Knickerbocker press installed
Price reduced to 1d.
1897 William John Sowden (ex-Port Adelaide News, Kapunda Herald) acting editor
1899 Sowden and Evan Kyffin Thomas joined the partnership. Sowden (later Sir William) editor 1899–1922.
1900 Name changed from South Australian Register to The Register
1901 3-decker Hoe press installed
1929 The company was restructured as Register Newspapers Limited with directors Evan Kyffin Thomas, C. Kyffin Thomas and Keith Murdoch.
1930 Became Register News-Pictorial
1931 Circulation improving but still unprofitable. Last issue 20 February 1931
Incorporated with The Advertiser as The Advertiser and Register on 21 February
Last issue 30 September.

See also
 Margaret Stevenson, a satirist and columnist for the paper, and wife of George Stevenson

References

External links
 
 
 

Publications established in 1836
Publications disestablished in 1931
1836 establishments in Australia
1931 disestablishments in Australia
History of Adelaide
Defunct newspapers published in Adelaide